Vorterøya is an island located in Skjervøy Municipality in Troms og Finnmark county, Norway. Vorterøya is located along the Lyngen fjord to the east of Kågen island and to the north of Uløya island. There are about 10 residents on the island who live there year-round. Many other residents live there in the summer months, but spend the winters elsewhere.

See also
 List of islands of Norway by area
 List of islands of Norway

References

External links
 Framtid i Nord: Ni døgn uten strøm 

Skjervøy
Islands of Troms og Finnmark